Courtenay Delsdue McVay Griffiths KC (born 10 October 1955) is a Jamaican-born British barrister, who has defended in some high-profile cases. He is a member of the London-based chambers 25 Bedford Row.

Early life
Born in Kingston, Jamaica, the second youngest child of a carpenter father, Griffiths moved to England with his family in 1961 and was raised in Coventry. Educated at Bablake School, he graduated in 1979 with an LLB (Hons) from the London School of Economics.

Career
Griffiths pursued a law career after his father told him stories about Norman Manley QC, the first Prime Minister of Jamaica. Griffiths was called to the bar in 1980.

He was a Legal Assistant to the Greater London Council's Police Support Committee, and also spent 12 months as a Revson Fellow at City College, New York. On return to the UK he practised mainly in West Yorkshire, in the Leeds and Bradford courts. He was made King's Counsel in 1998.

Today he practises predominantly in criminal defence, including murder cases, fraud and drug offences. He practises from 25 Bedford Row Chambers. Griffiths sits part-time in the Crown Court as a Recorder, chairs the Public Affairs Committee of the Bar Council, and worked for several years as chair of its Race Relations Committee.

Griffiths holds honorary Doctor of Laws degrees from Coventry University and Leeds Metropolitan University. In 2008, he gave the annual Norman Manley Lecture at the Norman Manley Law School, University of the West Indies, which aims to highlight issues of national and international public concern.

On 16 March 2021, whilst representing Claudia Webbe, Griffiths was taken to hospital by ambulance.

Notable cases
Brighton hotel bombing
Harrods bombing
1996 Docklands bombing
Risley Prison riot
Dartmoor Prison riot
R v Silcott & others - the Keith Blakelock murder trial which arose out of the Broadwater Farm Estate riot
Successful appeal for Johnson, Davis and Rowe, 2000
Damilola Taylor murder, first trial, 2002
Goswell v Commissioner of Police for the Metropolis - for a while, this case recorded the highest award of damages made by a jury against a police force
Charles Taylor trial in The Hague, 2007–2012

Personal life
Married to Angela, Griffiths has one daughter and three sons. He collects music, supports Liverpool F.C. and the West Indies Cricket Team, and is a trustee of the Bernie Grant Trust.

References

External links
25 Bedford Row profile
Interview with Courtenay Griffiths after walking out of Sierra Leone war crimes court - broadcast by Radio France Internationale, 8 February 2011

1955 births
Living people
People from Kingston, Jamaica
Migrants from British Jamaica to the United Kingdom
People from Coventry
British Rastafarians
People educated at Bablake School
Alumni of the London School of Economics
English barristers
British King's Counsel